Rubicon is a river in northern Italy.

Rubicon may also refer to:

Geography
Rubicon River (disambiguation)

Australia
Rubicon Estuary, Tasmania

Belgium
Rubicon (Belgium), an underground river of Belgium

United States
Rubicon (canal), Cape Coral, Florida
Rubicon (community), Wisconsin, an unincorporated community
Rubicon, California
Rubicon, Wisconsin, a town
Rubicon Keys, two small islands north of the upper Florida Keys
Rubicon Peak, mountain in the Sierra Nevada mountain range
Rubicon Point Light, small lighthouse on Lake Tahoe in California
Rubicon Springs, California
Rubicon Township, Illinois
Rubicon Township, Michigan
Rubicon Trail, an offroad route in Sierra Nevada, California

Art, media, and entertainment

Literature
Rubicon (novel), a 1999 historical novel by Steven Saylor
Rubicon, a 1965 novel by Agnar Mykle
Rubicon: The Last Years of the Roman Republic, a 2003 book by Tom Holland
Rubicon virus, a plot element in the Ilium/Olympos science fiction series by Dan Simmons

Music

Bands
Rubicon (English band), an English rock band and offshoot of Fields of the Nephilim that released two albums (1992 and 1995)
Rubicon (New Zealand band), a New Zealand punk pop band best known for the singles "Funny Boy" and "Bruce" (2001 and 2002)
Rubicon (American band), a funk rock band from California best known for the song "I'm Gonna Take Care of Everything"

Albums
Rubicon (Rubicon album), 1978
Rubicon (The Duggans album), 2005
Rubicon (Tristania album), 2010
Rubicon, a 2006 album by Flemish black metal band Ancient Rites
Icon II: Rubicon, a 2006 album by Asia's John Wetton and Geoffrey Downes following up on their 2005 album Icon

Songs
"Rubicon", a song by progressive rock artist, Peter Hammill on the 1974 album The Silent Corner and the Empty Stage
"Rubicon", a song by rock band Journey, from the 1983 album Frontiers
"Rubicon", a song by post-punk band Killing Joke, on the 1986 album Brighter Than a Thousand Suns
"Rubicon", a song by futurepop band, VNV Nation on the 1999 album Empires
"Rubicon", a song by industrial rock band, KMFDM on the 1999 album Adios
"Rubicon", a 2004 single by French electronic music artist Alan Braxe released on the 2005 compilation album The Upper Cuts
"Rubicon", a 2007 EP by Irish rock quartet The Kybosh
"Rubicon", a song by indie band, Milburn on the 2007 album These Are the Facts
"Rubicon", a song by progressive rock band Threshold on the 2012 album March of Progress
"Rubicon", a song by Audiomachine on the 2015 album Magnus
"Rubicon", a song by alternative metal band Deftones on the 2016 album Gore
"Rubicon", a song by Danny Michel on his 2016 album Matadora

Television
Rubicon (TV series), a 2010 American conspiratorial spy drama
Rubicon TV, a television production company in Norway
Rubicun III, a planet in the Star Trek: The Next Generation episode "Justice"
USS Rubicon, a runabout featured in the Star Trek: Deep Space Nine episode "One Little Ship"
Ballmastrz: Rubicon, a television special based on Ballmastrz: 9009

Video games
EVE Online: Rubicon, an add-on of the sci-fi MMO EVE Online
Rubicon, a 1991 computer game for the Commodore 64, Amiga, and Atari ST
Rubicon X, a modification of Marathon: Infinity

Companies and organizations
Rubicon Drinks, a British soft drink manufacturer
Rubicon Estate Winery, a winery in California
Rubicon Foundation, a non-profit company in Durham, North Carolina
Rubicon Group Holding, a Jordanian digital media company
Rubicon International Services, a British private military company 
Rubicon Project, an online advertising technology firm based in Los Angeles, California
Rubicon Race Team, an auto racing team
Rubicon Technologies a cloud-based waste and recycling company based in Lexington, Kentucky
Rubicon Technology, a sapphire crystal manufacturer
Team Rubicon, a US-based humanitarian organization dedicated to disaster response

Land vehicles
TJ Wrangler Rubicon, a trim level of the Jeep Wrangler off-road vehicle
Jeep Gladiator (JT), a trim level of the Jeep Gladiator pickup truck.

Other uses
 Rubicon (protein), a protein regulator in humans and other organisms
Rubicon (titular see), Roman Catholic church entity
Operation Rubicon, a Scottish police investigation into allegations of phone hacking, breach of data protection and perjury
Operation Rubicon, the secret ownership of the Crypto AG by U.S. and German intelligence agencies
Rubi-Con, a computer security conference held in Detroit, Michigan, from 1999 to 2003
Rouvikonas, an anarchist collective based in Athens, Greece.

See also
Crossing the Rubicon (disambiguation)
Rubycon (disambiguation)